A polydactyl cat is a cat with a congenital physical anomaly called polydactyly (or polydactylism, also known as hyperdactyly), which causes the cat to be born with more than the usual number of toes on one or more of its paws. Cats with this genetically inherited trait are most commonly found along the East Coast of North America (in the United States and Canada) and in South West England and Wales.

Occurrence
Polydactyly is a congenital abnormality that can be inherited in an autosomal dominant manner. Some cases of polydactyly are caused by mutations in the ZRS, a genetic enhancer that regulates expression of the sonic hedgehog (SHH) gene in the limb. The SHH protein is an important signalling molecule involved in patterning of many body elements, including limbs and digits.

Normal cats have a total of 18 toes, with five toes on each fore paw, and four toes on each hind paw; polydactyl cats may have as many as nine digits on their front or hind paws. Both Jake, a Canadian polydactyl cat, and Paws, an American polydactyl cat, were recognised by Guinness World Records as having the highest number of toes on a cat, 28. Tigger, a tabby polydactyl cat, also had 28 toes, but passed before it could be verified by Guinness World Records. Various combinations of anywhere from four to seven toes per paw are common. Polydactyly is most commonly found on the front paws only; it is rare for a cat to have polydactyl hind paws only, and polydactyly of all four paws is even less common.

History and folklore
The condition seems to be most commonly found in cats along the East Coast of North America (in the United States and Canada) and in South West England, Wales and Kingston-upon-Hull. Polydactyl cats have been extremely popular as ship's cats. Although there is some controversy over whether the most common variant of the trait originated as a mutation in New England or was brought there from Britain, there seems to be agreement that it spread widely as a result of cats carried on ships originating in Boston, Massachusetts, and the prevalence of polydactyly among the cat population of various ports correlates with the dates when they first established trade with Boston. Contributing to the spread of polydactyl cats by this means, sailors were long known to value polydactyl cats especially for their extraordinary climbing and hunting abilities as an aid in controlling shipboard rodents. Some sailors thought they bring good luck at sea. The rarity of polydactyl cats in Europe may be because they were hunted and killed based on superstitions about witchcraft.

Genetic work studying the DNA basis of the condition indicates that many different mutations in the same ZRS area can all lead to polydactyly.

Author Ernest Hemingway became a famous aficionado of polydactyl cats after a ship captain gave him a six-toed cat that he named Snow White. Upon Hemingway's death in 1961, his former home in Key West, Florida, became a museum and a home for his cats, and it currently houses approximately 50 descendants of his cats (about half of which are polydactyl). Because of his love for these animals, polydactyl cats are sometimes referred to as "Hemingway cats."

Naming
Nicknames for polydactyl cats include Hemingway cats, mitten cats, conch cats, boxing cats, mitten-foot cats, snowshoe cats, boston-toed cats, thumb cats, six-fingered cats, and Cardi-cats. Two specific breeds recognized by some cat fancier clubs are the American Polydactyl and Maine Coon Polydactyl.

Breeding
American Polydactyl cats are bred as a specific cat breed, with specific physical and behavioral characteristics in addition to extra digits.

The American Polydactyl is not to be confused with the pedigree Maine Coon Polydactyl. The polydactyl form of the Maine Coon is being reinstated by some breeders.

Genetics

In the case of preaxial polydactyly of the Maine Coon cat (Hemingway mutant) a mutation of the cis-regulatory element ZRS (ZPA regulator sequence) is associated. ZRS is a noncoding element, 800 kilobasepairs (kb) remote to the target gene SHH. An ectopic expression of SHH is seen on the anterior side of the limb. Normally SHH is expressed in an organiser region, called the zone of polarizing activity (ZPA) on the posterior limb side. From there it diffuses anteriorly, laterally to the growth direction of the limb. In the mutant mirroring smaller ectopic expression in a new organiser region is seen on the posterior side of the limb. This ectopic expression causes cell proliferation delivering the raw material for one or more new digits. An identical sequence at this position serves the same function in human and mice and cause similar symptoms when mutated. Different mutations have different specific effects: for example, while the Hemingway (Hw) mutant tends to mostly induce extra fingers in the fore limbs, many other mutations affect the posterior limbs too.

Polydactyly is a spontaneous complex phenotypic variation, developed in one generation. In the concrete preaxial form of the Hemingway (Hw) mutant the variation is induced by a single point mutation in a noncoding cis-regulatory element for SHH. In an extensive phenotypic variation like this, one or more complete digits at each single limb are developed including nerves, blood vessels, muscles and ligaments. The physiology of the digits can be perfect. This complex phenotypic result cannot be explained by the mutation alone. The mutation can only induce the variation. In the consequence of the mutation, thousands of events, each different from the wildtype, occur on different organisation layers, such as expression changes of other genes, cell-cell signal exchange, cell differentiation, cell and tissue growth. The summarized small random changes on all layers build the raw material and the process steps for the generation of the plastic variation. The mentioned form of polydactyly of the Hemingway mutant shows a biased variation. In a recent empirical study first the number of extra toes of 375 mutant Maine Coon cats were variable (polyphenism) and second, the number of extra toes followed a discontinuous statistical distribution. They were not equally distributed as one might expect of an identical single point mutation. The example demonstrates that the variation is not explained completely by the mutation alone.

See also
 Polydactyly in early tetrapods
 Ship's cat

Notable polydactyl cats 
 Lil Bub
 Paddles

References

Further reading

External links

 Owner's appeal over cat's 26 toes

Cat health
Congenital disorders of musculoskeletal system
Supernumerary body parts
Toes